The Kedon Range is a mountain range in Magadan Oblast, Far Eastern Federal District, Russia.

The Kedon Range is separated from the other ranges of the Highlands by tectonic basins. The mountains are not very high and are dissected by numerous river valleys, mainly tributaries of the Kedon. The area of the range is uninhabited.

History
Formerly there was a village in the southern area of the range where the Buksunda (Буксунда) reindeer-breeding state farm operated. The village had 115 inhabitants in 1984 but lost its population at the turn of the millennium. Now it lies abandoned.

Geography
The Kedon Range rises in the central sector of the Kolyma Highlands system. The main ridge runs in an arch to the west and southwest of the course of the Omolon. The southern end is not clearly delimited, with the Kedon and Molkaty ranges merging with each other. To the west and northwest rises the Kongin Range.

Hydrography

Flora
The slopes of the Kedon Range are bare and have a barren look. There are sparse larch forests in the valleys.

See also
List of mountains and hills of Russia

References

External links

Kolyma - Tourism
Epithermal mineralization in the Kedon Paleozoic volcano-plutonic belt, Northeast Russia: Geochemical studies of Au–Ag mineralization

Mountain ranges of Magadan Oblast
Kolyma Mountains